Angela is a 1995 drama film directed by Rebecca Miller and starring John Ventimiglia, Anna Thomson, Miranda Stuart Rhyne and Vincent Gallo. Miller's directorial debut, it won awards at the Sundance Film Festival, the Brussels International Festival of Fantasy Film and the Gotham Awards.

Plot
Angela is a 10-year-old girl trying to cope with a dysfunctional family and is on a quest to "purify" herself.  Her parents, Mae and Andrew, are former performers who have resigned themselves to the loss of their dreams.  They are now having problems in their relationship.  Mae has drastic mood shifts that bring her from manic happiness to utter misery.  Andrew tries to hold everyone together, but Mae's vacillations are becoming more than he can manage.

Angela tries to cope by inventing an imaginary universe of 'order' for herself and her 6 year old little sister, Ellie.  Left to figure out everything for themselves, she grabs at scraps of religion, superstition, and fantasy to try to make some sense out of the world and understand the difference between good and evil.

Adrift, she and Ellie concoct magical rituals and have visions of fallen angels and the Virgin Mary; reading signs in the way a towel falls off a chair or a tool falls off a truck, they set off to find their way to heaven.  They wander through the neighborhood, meet a lot of strange people, and try to find a way to absolve themselves of whatever 'sins' they may have committed, and 'go to heaven'.

At first, the stories that Angela tells Ellie are mainly meant to scare her into submission.   But as time goes on, and her mother succumbs to mental illness, Angela becomes obsessed with the idea that the only way her mother is going to get better is if she and her sister can wash away all of their sins.

Cast
 John Ventimiglia as Andrew
 Anna Thomson as Mae
 Miranda Stuart Rhyne as Angela
 Vincent Gallo as Preacher
 Peter Facinelli as Lucifer
 Hynden Walch as Darlene
 Caitlin Hall as Anne
 Frances Conroy as Anne's mother

Reception
According to an article in The New York Times, Angela is a film that "is at its best when looking at the world through Angela's eyes before she has gone numb."

References

External links

1995 films
1995 independent films
American independent films
American drama films
1995 drama films
Films about dysfunctional families
Sundance Film Festival award winners
Films directed by Rebecca Miller
Portrayals of the Virgin Mary in film
The Devil in film
1995 directorial debut films
1990s English-language films
1990s American films